Schreiber is a German surname meaning "scribe" or "writer"; often compared to English Clark or Clerk. Notable people with the name include:

People
Adam Schreiber (born 1962), American football player
Andreas Schreiber (born 1987), Swedish basketball player 
Avery Schreiber (1935–2002), American comedian
Barney Schreiber (1882–1964), American baseball player
Birgit Schreiber, German cross country skier
Boris Schreiber (1923–2008), French writer
Brad Schreiber, American writer
Chaim Schreiber, founder of Schreiber Furniture
Charles Schreiber (1826–1884), English academic, fine arts collector and politician 
Charlotte Schreiber (1834–1922), English-Canadian painter and illustrator
Christian Schreiber (born 1980), German rower
Christian Schreiber (philosopher) (born 1781), philosopher
Claudia Schreiber (born 1958), German journalist
Collingwood Schreiber (1831–1918), English-Canadian surveyor, engineer and civil servant
Dan Schreiber (producer), United Kingdom radio producer
Dan Schreiber (born 1985), American poker player
Daniel Schreiber (born 1971), British-Israeli Insurer
Daniela Schreiber (born 1989), German swimmer
David Servan-Schreiber (1961–2011), French physician, neuroscientist and author
Doug Schreiber (born 1963), American baseball coach
Edmond Schreiber (1890–1978), British general of World War II
Edwin Schreiber (1936–2010), South African cricketer
Elaine Schreiber (1939–2017), Australian table tennis player
Ellen Schreiber, American young-adult fiction author
Emanuel Schreiber (1852–1932), American rabbi
Ernie Schreiber, editor of the Lancaster New Era
Ernie Schreiber (born 1929), German-born Canadian politician
Eva Schreiber (born 1958), German politician
Flora Rheta Schreiber (1918–1988), American journalist
Franz Schreiber (1904–1976), Standartenführer in the German Waffen SS
Gaby Schreiber (1904–1976), industrial and interior designer 
Grzegorz Schreiber (born 1961), Polish politician 
Gustav Schreiber (1916–1995), Hauptscharführer in the German Waffen SS
Hartmut Schreiber (born 1944), German rower
Hank Schreiber (1891–1968), American baseball player
Helmuth Schreiber (1917–2008) a Sturmbannführer in the German Waffen-SS 
Hermann Schreiber (1882–1954) German doctor of philosophy, rabbi and journalist
Hieronymus Schreiber (died 1547), German doctor, mathematician and astronomer
Jan Schreiber (born 1941), American poet
Jean-Jacques Servan-Schreiber or JJSS (1924–2006), French journalist and politician
Joe Schreiber, author and MRI technician
John Schreiber (born 1954), American writer and teacher
John Schreiber (baseball) (born 1994), American baseball pitcher
Josef Schreiber (1919–1945), German soldier
Juergen Schreiber (born 1947), German investigative journalist and author 
Jürgen Schreiber (disambiguation)
Karlheinz Schreiber (born 1934), German-born lobbyist, fundraiser, arms dealer, and businessman
Charlotte Elizabeth Schreiber or Lady Charlotte Guest (1812–1895), English translator and business woman
Larry Schreiber (born 1947), American football player
Le Anne Schreiber (born 1945), American journalist
Liev Schreiber (born 1967), American actor
Linda Schreiber, American television soap opera writer
Mark Schreiber (disambiguation)
Martin E. Schreiber (1904–1997), American carpenter, real estate agent and politician
Martin J. Schreiber (born 1939), American politician, publisher, and lobbyist - governor of Wisconsin (1977–1979)
Moses Schreiber or Moshe Sofer (1762–1839), European rabbi
Olaf Schreiber (born 1969), German footballer
Pablo Schreiber (born 1978), American actor, younger brother of Liev Schreiber
Patrick Schreiber (born 1979), German politician
Paul Schreiber (1902–1982), American baseball player
Peter Schreiber (born 1964), German javelin thrower
Raemer Schreiber (1910–1998), American physicist
Robert D. Schreiber (born 1946), American immunologist
Robin Schreiber (born 1949/1950), American basketball superfan
Ryan Schreiber, editor-in-chief of Pitchfork Media
Simon Schreiber (1821–1883), Austrian rabbi
Stuart Schreiber (born 1956), American chemical biologist
Ted Schreiber (born 1938), American baseball player
Terry Schreiber (born 1937), American theater director
 Thomas Schreiber (bobsledder), Swiss bobsledder
 Thomas Schreiber (innkeeper), German innkeeper executed for witchcraft
Timothy Schreiber, London-based, German-born architect and design artist
Ulrich Schreiber (born 1951), German director of the International Literature Festival Berlin
Urs Schreiber (born 1974), German mathematician and theoretical physicist
Wally Schreiber (born 1962), Canadian hockey player
Walter Schreiber (1893–1970) German military officer and doctor
Walther Schreiber (1884–1958), German politician - mayor of Berlin (1953–1955)
William F. Schreiber (born 1925), American electrical engineer and professor
Zach Schreiber (born 1982), American baseball pitcher
Zahra Schreiber, a wrestler in NXT
Zvi Schreiber (born 1969), British-Israeli serial entrepreneur

See also
 Schreiber (disambiguation)
 Shriver

Occupational surnames
German-language surnames
Jewish surnames